Cumming is a city in Warren County, Iowa, United States. The population was 436 at the time of the 2020 census. It is the hometown of former Senator Tom Harkin.

A part of the Des Moines–West Des Moines Metropolitan Statistical Area, Cumming is considered one of the smallest incorporated suburbs of the metro area.  The smallest of all cities in the five-county metro area is Bevington, in Madison and Warren counties, which had a population of 58 in 2000.

Geography
Cumming is located at  (41.485723, -93.761929).

The Great Western Trail passes through the city.

Demographics

2010 census
As of the census of 2010, there were 351 people, 128 households, and 102 families living in the city. The racial makeup of the city was 96.9% White, 0.9% African American, 0.6% Asian, 0.6% from other races, and 1.1% from two or more races. Hispanic or Latino of any race were 1.1% of the population.

There were 128 households, of which 39.8% had children under the age of 18 living with them, 70.3% were married couples living together, 6.3% had a female householder with no husband present, 3.1% had a male householder with no wife present, and 20.3% were non-families. 14.1% of all households were made up of individuals, and 5.5% had someone living alone who was 65 years of age or older. The average household size was 2.74 and the average family size was 3.07.

The median age in the city was 40.1 years. 27.6% of residents were under the age of 18; 4.6% were between the ages of 18 and 24; 30.5% were from 25 to 44; 28% were from 45 to 64; and 9.4% were 65 years of age or older. The gender makeup of the city was 49.0% male and 51.0% female.

2000 census
As of the census of 2000, there were 162 people, 65 households, and 52 families living in the city. The racial makeup of the city was 100.00% White.

There were 65 households, out of which 27.7% had children under the age of 18 living with them, 72.3% were married couples living together, 3.1% had a female householder with no husband present, and 18.5% were non-families. 13.8% of all households were made up of individuals, and 3.1% had someone living alone who was 65 years of age or older. The average household size was 2.48 and the average family size was 2.74.

In the city, the population was spread out, with 19.8% under the age of 18, 3.7% from 18 to 24, 30.9% from 25 to 44, 28.4% from 45 to 64, and 17.3% who were 65 years of age or older. The median age was 41 years. For every 100 females, there were 97.6 males. For every 100 females age 18 and over, there were 113.1 males.

The median income for a household in the city was $52,813, and the median income for a family was $56,071. Males had a median income of $40,893 versus $21,750 for females. The per capita income for the city was $23,575. None of the population or families were below the poverty line.

Notable people
 Tom Harkin, United States Senator from Iowa (1985 - 2015)
 Brent Allen, musical artist

See also
Great Western Trail (Iowa)
St. Patrick's Church (Cumming, Iowa), listed on the National Register of Historic Places

References

Cities in Iowa
Cities in Warren County, Iowa
Des Moines metropolitan area